Bernard Orcel (born 2 April 1945) is a French former alpine skier who competed in the 1968 Winter Olympics and 1972 Winter Olympics.

External links
 sports-reference.com
 

1945 births
Living people
French male alpine skiers
Olympic alpine skiers of France
Alpine skiers at the 1968 Winter Olympics
Alpine skiers at the 1972 Winter Olympics
Place of birth missing (living people)
20th-century French people